Køge Stadion is a multi-use stadium in Køge, Denmark.  It is currently used mostly for football matches and is the home stadium of HB Køge men and HB Køge women, and their mother club Køge BK. The stadium used to hold 10,000 people and opened in 1932. After renovation in 2019, it now holds room for 1,000 people seated.

References

External links
Entry at Stadions.dk

Køge Boldklub
Football venues in Denmark
Køge Municipality
Capelli Sport